Scala Dei (Latin for "God's ladder") may refer to:
Escaladieu Abbey, a French monastery
Santa Maria d'Escaladei, a Spanish monastery
Scala Dei, a treatise by Francesc Eiximenis